"Friday I'm in Love" is a song by British rock band the Cure. Released as the second single from their ninth studio album, Wish (1992), in May 1992, the song was a worldwide hit, reaching number six in the UK and number 18 in the United States, where it also topped the Modern Rock Tracks chart. It also won the award for European Viewer's Choice for Best Music Video at the 1992 MTV Video Music Awards. It was also featured in the Season 7 episode "Pam I Am" from Regular Show, He's Just Not That Into You and more.

Robert Smith, the song's primary writer, described it in 1992 as both "a throw your hands in the air, let's get happy kind of record" and "a very naïve, happy type of pop song."

Production
During the writing process, Robert Smith became convinced that he had inadvertently stolen the chord progression from somewhere, and this led him to a state of paranoia where he called everyone he could think of and played the song for them, asking if they had heard it before. None of them had, and Smith realised that the melody was indeed his. "It's always been paradoxical that it's pushed down people's throats that we're a goth band," Smith observed. "Because, to the general public, we're not. To taxi drivers, I'm the bloke that sings 'Friday I'm in Love'. I'm not the bloke who sings 'Shake Dog Shake' or 'One Hundred Years'."

The song was written to be a slower number than its upbeat final rendition. While the track was recorded in D major, the commercially released version sounds a quarter-tone higher (halfway between D and D-sharp) due to Smith forgetting to disengage the vari-speed function on the multi-track recorder after toying with it before the actual recording process took place. When played live, the song is played in its original intended key as opposed to the speed discrepancy heard on the record. The track was produced by David M. Allen and the Cure.

Release
"Friday I'm in Love" was the second single taken from the band's ninth studio album, Wish, and was released in the United Kingdom on 15 May 1992. Unusually, two formats of the song were released on a Friday instead of a Monday, so it debuted on the UK Singles Chart at a low number 31 on the chart week beginning 17 May. The following week, after the other two formats went on sale, the single rose to number eight and peaked at number six during its third week on the chart. In the United States, the song reached number 18 on the Billboard Hot 100, giving the band their last American top-40 hit to date. It was also the band's last song (in a string of four) to top the Billboard Modern Rock Tracks chart, matching the success of their previous single, "High", with a four-week stint at number one.

Music video
The video, directed by Tim Pope, features the band performing the song in front of various backdrops on a soundstage, in homage to French silent filmmaker Georges Méliès: the video features the appearance of characters from his The Eclipse, or the Courtship of the Sun and Moon. Throughout the video the band play with various props and costumes while several extras wander around, causing chaos and ultimately trashing the set. Tim Pope makes a cameo at the beginning, riding a rocking horse and yelling out high-pitched stage directions through a plastic megaphone after inhaling helium from a balloon. The band's Japanese make-up artist also makes an appearance. The final shot is of bassist Simon Gallup crouching and peering into the camera while wearing a bridal veil and holding some champagne. The producer of "Friday, I'm in Love", Dave M. Allen, makes an appearance in the background, also holding up props. Another oddity is the band's name on the drum—a scrawled "The Cures" rather than the band's singular name.

Track listing

Personnel
 Robert Smith – vocals, guitar
 Simon Gallup – bass
 Porl Thompson – guitar
 Boris Williams – drums
 Perry Bamonte – six-string bass, keyboards

Charts

Weekly charts

Year-end charts

Certifications

Release history

See also

 List of Billboard number-one alternative singles of the 1990s#1992

References

External links
 

1992 singles
1992 songs
The Cure songs
Elektra Records singles
Fiction Records singles
Jangle pop songs
List songs
Music videos directed by Tim Pope
Song recordings produced by David M. Allen
Songs written by Jason Cooper
Songs written by Porl Thompson
Songs written by Robert Smith (musician)
Songs written by Simon Gallup